Twitchen may refer to:

Twitchen, Devon
Twitchen, Shropshire